Daniel Truhitte (born September 10, 1943) is an American actor, best known for his portrayal of Rolfe Gruber, the young Austrian telegram delivery boy in The Sound of Music (1965). Truhitte is a singer, actor, dancer, and performance teacher.

Biography and Career
Daniel Truhitte began dance training at the age of 6 and began taking voice lessons at the age of 10. When he was 15 years old, he received a scholarship to The Sacramento Ballet. After high school, Truhitte received a scholarship to the Pasadena Playhouse. He also attended Ambassador College in Pasadena, California.

Sound of Music
He was the last person who was cast in The Sound of Music and obtained the role after going through multiple auditions, including audition with choreographers.

After filming The Sound of Music, he joined the Marine Corps. In 1969, Truhitte moved to Weddington, North Carolina, and then finally to Concord, North Carolina, and began teaching young performers. He appeared in an episode of Entertainment Tonight titled "A Day in the Life of Dan Truhitte" on September 10, 1993, after The Old Courthouse Theatre of Concord, North Carolina asked him to play Captain Von Trapp in their production of The Sound of Music. Truhitte portrayed Captain von Trapp once again in the Hudson, North Carolina Dinner Theatre Production of The Sound of Music in October 2013. He also appeared in gala concert performance of The Sound of Music at New York’s Carnegie Hall as Baron Elberfeld, a guest at a party.

Personal life 
Truhitte has been married three times. He married his co-star Charmian Carr's understudy, German actress Gabrielle Hennig, in 1966. They dated while filming The Sound of Music and married 2 years later. The marriage ended in divorce. He married Mary Miller in 1987, which also ended in divorce. He later married Tarealia Hanney in 1992. 

Truhitte has three sons, one of whom is opera singer Thomas Rolf Truhitte.

References

External links

American male film actors
1943 births
Living people
Male actors from Sacramento, California
20th-century American male actors
People from Weddington, North Carolina
People from Concord, North Carolina